The Book of Unwritten Tales: The Critter Chronicles is a point-and-click adventure video game created by German developer King Art Games. It is a prequel to The Book of Unwritten Tales that was released in 2009.

Premise 
The Critter Chronicles tells the story of how adventurer Nate Bonnett and Critter, his hairy sidekick, first met, all set before their appearance in Wilbur’s and Ivo’s adventure in The Book of Unwritten Tales. Enjoy a thrilling and hilarious point-and-click adventure in the fantasy world of Aventasia. Travel from the Northlands to the Mage’s Tower of Seastone and experience a story that offers tremendous fun for seasoned players of “The Book of Unwritten Tales” and newcomers alike.

References 

2012 video games
Adventure games
King Art Games games
Point-and-click adventure games
Fantasy video games
Linux games
MacOS games
Single-player video games
THQ Nordic games
Video game expansion packs
Video game prequels
Video games developed in Germany
Windows games